Roberto Antonio "Cóndor" Rojas Saavedra (born 8 August 1957) is a retired Chilean football goalkeeper. In 1989, he deliberately injured himself during a World Cup qualifying match in an attempt to avoid a loss by the Chile national team. The incident resulted in a lifetime ban for Rojas and one World Cup ban for Chile. His ban was subsequently lifted in 2001.

Career 
Rojas was born and raised in Chile. He began his career in 1976 with the Chilean club Aviación. Rojas went on to play for Colo-Colo from 1983 until 1987. With Colo-Colo, Rojas won national titles in 1983 and 1986. In 1987, after a successful performance in the Copa América, he transferred to Brazil's São Paulo where he remained until 1989. After his retirement he returned to São Paulo to serve as a goalkeeper coach, training Rogério Ceni. In 2003, Rojas served as interim coach and took the team to the Copa Libertadores for the first time since 1994. He was later a goalkeeping coach for Brazilian side Sport Club do Recife.

1989 World Cup qualifying incident 

In 1989, Rojas was in goal for Chile's 1990 FIFA World Cup qualifier against Brazil at Rio de Janeiro's Maracanã stadium. Chile, down 1–0, would be eliminated from the upcoming World Cup if they lost or if the match ended in a draw. Around the 70-minute mark of the match, Rojas fell to the pitch writhing and holding his forehead. A firework, thrown from the stands by a Brazilian fan named Rosenery Mello do Nascimento, was smoldering on the pitch about a yard away. It seemed that Rojas had been hit by the firework, an incident that could have had the match nullified and possibly even have had Brazil penalized by FIFA. Rojas, his head bloodied, was carried off the field; his teammates then refused to return claiming that conditions were unsafe. The match was unfinished.

Video evidence later showed that Rojas had not been hit by the firework. His head injury was discovered to have been self-inflicted with a razor blade he had hidden in his glove. FIFA awarded Brazil a 2–0 win, effectively eliminating Chile from the 1990 World Cup. As a consequence, Chile was banned from the 1994 FIFA World Cup and Rojas was banned for life, along with the coach Orlando Aravena and the team doctor Daniel Rodriguez.

A Chilean inquiry found that Aravena had ordered Rojas and Rodriguez by walkie-talkie to remain on the ground and that Rojas was to leave the field on a stretcher. The team's co-captain, Fernando Astengo, was banned from football for the next five years for deciding to remove the team from the field.

In 2001, following a request for a pardon, Rojas' ban was lifted by FIFA.

References

External links

1957 births
Footballers from Santiago
Chilean footballers
Chilean expatriate footballers
Association football goalkeepers
Colo-Colo footballers
São Paulo FC players
São Paulo FC managers
Chile international footballers
1983 Copa América players
1987 Copa América players
1989 Copa América players
Expatriate footballers in Brazil
Expatriate football managers in Brazil
Chilean expatriate sportspeople in Brazil
Living people
Cheating in sports
C.D. Aviación footballers
Association football controversies
Chilean football managers
Sportspeople banned for life